John Martin (born 15 July 1981 in Bethnal Green, London) is an English footballer who was last attached to Isthmian League Division One North club Harlow Town.

Career
Martin began his career with Leyton Orient, making over 90 Football League appearances, before dropping into non-League football with Farnborough Town, Hornchurch, Grays Athletic and Stevenage Borough.

During the 2007–08 season, Martin enjoyed a successful first season featuring in the centre of midfield for Stevenage Borough. However, the arrival of new manager Graham Westley saw Martin fall out of favour and his first-team chances were limited. In February 2009, he was loaned out to Ebbsfleet United. Martin was recalled by manager Westley on 7 April 2009, playing a vital role in the two wins against Cambridge United and Ebbsfleet United. The latter was to be his last performance for Stevenage and on 20 May 2009, Martin was released by Stevenage Borough. On 7 August, it was announced that Martin had joined Essex based Conference South outfit Chelmsford City. Martin's stay lasted two seasons, as he was released by the club in May 2011.

He went on to join Isthmian League Division One North club Harlow Town in January 2012, making his début in the 1–0 away win over Maldon & Tiptree on 21 January. However, Martin left Harlow after playing three games for them up to 18 February.

Honours
FA Trophy: 2005, 2006
Conference South (VI): 2005

References

External links

1981 births
Footballers from Bethnal Green
Living people
English footballers
Leyton Orient F.C. players
Farnborough F.C. players
Hornchurch F.C. players
Grays Athletic F.C. players
Stevenage F.C. players
Chelmsford City F.C. players
Harlow Town F.C. players
English Football League players
National League (English football) players
Isthmian League players
Association football midfielders